Sai Ma is one of the ten subdistricts (tambon) of Mueang Nonthaburi District, in Nonthaburi Province, Thailand. Neighbouring subdistricts are (from north clockwise) Tha It, Bang Kraso, Suan Yai (across the Chao Phraya River), Bang Si Mueang, Bang Krang and Bang Rak Noi. In 2020 it had a total population of 23,742 people.

Administration

Central administration
The subdistrict is subdivided into 6 administrative villages (muban).

Local administration
The whole area of the subdistrict is covered by Sai Ma Town Municipality.

References

External links
Website of Sai Ma Town Municipality

Tambon of Nonthaburi province
Populated places in Nonthaburi province